Laura Vargas Koch (born 29 June 1990) is a former German judoka. She competed at the 2016 Summer Olympics in Rio de Janeiro in the women's 70 kg division. She won a bronze medal by defeating María Bernabéu of Spain in the bronze medal match.

References

External links
 

1990 births
Living people
German female judoka
European Games silver medalists for Germany
European Games medalists in judo
Judoka at the 2015 European Games
German people of Chilean descent
Judoka at the 2016 Summer Olympics
Olympic judoka of Germany
Olympic bronze medalists for Germany
Olympic medalists in judo
Medalists at the 2016 Summer Olympics
Universiade medalists in judo
Universiade silver medalists for Germany
Judoka at the 2019 European Games
Medalists at the 2011 Summer Universiade
21st-century German women